Kulipari is a Flash animated streaming television series co-produced by Splash Entertainment, The Outlook Company and Telegael Teoranta. Its first season An Army of Frogs debuted in September 2016 as a Netflix original series. The show is based on Trevor Pryce's novel series An Army of Frogs. Kulipari: Heritage, a four-issue comic book miniseries published by Red 5 Comics, was released from August to November 2016. The series was renewed for a second season called Kulipari: Dream Walker on March 8, 2017, which was released on November 20, 2018. A graphic novel called Kulipari: Warflower was purported to be released on January 1, 2019, but it was canceled.

Three compilation movies for season 1, Kulipari: An Army of Frogs, Kulipari: Mercenaries and Kulipari: Amphibian's Rise have been released on Amazon, Google Play and iTunes between 2017 and 2018.

On February 28, 2023, it was announced that Hulu will be continuing the series with a newly announced third season titled Kulipari: A King Rises, set to premiere at the end of the year, as well as a CGI film reboot of the first season, set to premiere in 2024. The first two seasons were added to Hulu in February. The first two seasons have also been remastered and include new opening and ending credit sequences.

Plot
The series takes place in the Amphibilands—a hidden village of frogs. For many years the inhabitants of the Amphibilands have lived safely, protected by a magical Veil and an elite group of poison frogs called the Kulipari. The story begins with the frogs of the Amphibilands finding their homeland threatened by an army of scorpions teamed up with the magically powerful Spider Queen. Our hero, Darel, a young frog that has always dreamed of joining the Kulipari despite his lack of poison, finds himself at the front of the battle. With the help of his friends, Darel must overcome his anxieties to embrace his dream of becoming a Kulipari warrior and save all the frogs from extinction.

Characters

Main characters
Darel - The main protagonist, and an Australian wood frog. Son of Apari and Acala.
Gee - Darel's loyal best friend, he is a fat, gluttonous, awkward Australian wood frog. 
Coorah - Another Australian wood frog who is also a friend of Darel, and brief girlfriend of Arabanoo. She has medical skills.
Stinger - A young scorpion who is identified as being "of Marmoo's bloodline" by Old Jir.
Tharta, Thuma & Tipi - Triplets, children of Apari and Acala and younger siblings of Darel.
Old Jir - An elderly Kulipari frog warrior living as a hermit near the village.

Professional Kulipari Frogs
Burnu - The green, wig-wearing male leader of an elite team of four Kulipari.
Ponto - Yellow male medic of Burnu's team, brother to Dingo.
Dingo - Brown female Archer of Burnu's team, sister to Ponto.
Quoba - The green, hooded female scout of Burnu's team, and Darel's girlfriend.
Wilka - The newest partner of Burnu, a white Kulipari female who was sent on a mission to infiltrate the spider god's fortress.
Koa - A young Kulipari frog who was raised by geckos. He was briefly kidnapped by Darkan.

Villains
Lord Marmoo - A powerful scorpion warlord who is the main antagonist of the first season and Darel's first biggest nemesis.
Commander Pigo - Marmoo's younger brother and right-hand man.
Spider Queen Jarrah - The queen of the redback spiders.
Darkan - A giant marine iguana warlord ruling the fortress city of Cardigal.
Nahradhan - The golden-colored "god" of spiders and their strongest Nightcaster, whom Falgha worked with after Season 1.
Daly - A white female spider Nightcaster and Darkan's right-hand woman.

Other characters
Apari - The late Kulipari and husband of Acala and Darel and the triplets' father (in the books, he is a corroboree frog).
Acala - Darel's mother and widow of Apari.
Arabanoo - A red-eyed tree frog, who initially thinks Darel will never become a Kulipari (in the books, he is a White-lipped tree frog).
Turtle King Sergu - A wise old turtle and practitioner of Dreamcasting magic.
Pippi - A young platypus girl and a Stargazer student who has visions that help Darel on his quest. She remains and becomes a Dreamcaster of the new settlement in Season 2.
Killara - A green lizard mercenary leader who works for Marmoo with his people.
Skink - A female skink mercenary working for Killara.
Nogo - A large and strong male bearded dragon mercenary working for Killara until Killara betrayed him and Skink.
Xava - An mute white male lizard living with in the village Darel founded.
Caz - An elderly male scorpion who is the survivor of the Amphibilands wars. He was later killed by Stinger for poisoning Jir.
Falgha - A female redback spider who is the current leader of the spiders after the fall of Cardigal.

More characters to be listed

Cast
 Josh Keaton as Darel, Nahradhan
 Mikey Kelley as Gee
 Lacey Chabert as Coorah
 Phil Lamarr as Arabanoo, Apari, Killara, Stinger, Darkan
 Keith David as Lord Marmoo
 Charlie Adler as Commander Pigo, Coorah's dad, Bindi, additional voices
 Wendie Malick as Spider Queen Jarrah
 Mark Hamill as Old Jir, Ponto (episodes 8–9), Caz
 Jess Harnell as Burnu, Yabber, and Sergu
 Candi Milo as Dingo, The Stargazer, Fahlga
 Cree Summer as Skink, Daly and Scorpicurist
 Kevin Michael Richardson as Ponto (episodes 10-present), Nogo, Tharta, Scorpion Warriors
 Kath Soucie as Pippi, The Rainbow Serpent
 Rolonda Watts as Chief Olba
 Amy Margolis as Quoba, Tipi, Akala
 Laraine Newman as Koa, Thuma

Episodes

Season 1: An Army of Frogs (2016)

Season 2: Dream Walker (2018)

Accolades
Mark Hamill was nominated for Outstanding Performer in an Animated Program at the 46th Daytime Emmy Awards.

References

External links
 
  at Netflix
 

2010s American animated television series
2016 American television series debuts
2018 American television series endings
American children's animated action television series
American children's animated adventure television series
American children's animated comedy television series
American children's animated drama television series
American children's animated fantasy television series
2010s American comedy-drama television series
American flash animated television series
Animated television series about frogs
English-language Netflix original programming
Animated television series by Netflix
Netflix children's programming
Television series by Splash Entertainment
American television shows based on children's books